Ken Bacon may refer to:
Kenneth Bacon (1944–2009), American journalist
Ken Bacon (politician) (born 1944), Australian politician